Scoop is a children's TV series first broadcast by the BBC on the CBBC channel from January 5, 2009 to August 10, 2011.

The show stars Shaun Williamson as Digby Digworth, an ambitious but inept journalist for a fictional local newspaper, The Pilbury Post.  Each episode centres on Digby's failure to get a scoop, ending up causing mayhem and disaster instead. In each of these he is accompanied by Hacker, a dog. The show also stars Mark Benton as the newspaper's short-tempered editor, Max de Lacey and there are guest appearances by popular British TV actors such as Lesley Joseph and Mina Anwar who plays Selena Sharp, reporter for a rival paper. In one episode the famous children's writer J. K. Rowling is parodied as a novelist character called T. K. Towling, while in another Jeremy Clarkson (ex Top Gear presenter) is satirised with the character Clark Jameson.

The episodes are 28 minutes in length and were originally stripped (broadcast every day) across weekdays on BBC One at 3.25 pm between 5 January and 23 January.

Hacker T. Dog, a Border Terrier puppet character, made his first appearance on this show. He was later used as a presenter on the CBBC TV channel. Hacker appeared presenting the CBBC channel from 23 May 2009 with Iain Stirling, a comedian from Edinburgh. In series one of Scoop he was operated by Andy Heath, but when he began presenting CBBC he was operated by Phil Fletcher who has puppeteered Hacker T. Dog since.

A second season began airing in September 2010 and a third began airing a new episode every day from 25 July.

Plot

Each episode begins in much the same way with a short sequence in which Digby is awoken by an elaborate alarm system, then tries in vain to prevent the paperboy throwing his newspaper into a puddle. Similarly the episodes all end in the same way with a short sequence in which the editor inspects a newspaper front page expecting to see a great story, but is instead frustrated when it shows instead a picture depicting the results of Digby's clumsiness and mistakes, at which point Max de Lacey shouts "DIGBY DIGWORTH!".

In every series 1 episode, Digby and Hacker have to turn to the mysterious Sid the Source when in trouble, who considers covering his face from the public. Hacker often mistakes Sid the Source as a sauce topping, so every time Digby said "Every reporter needs a source.", Hacker holds up a different type of sauce each episode.

Cast

 Shaun Williamson as Digby Digworth
 Andy Heath as Hacker (series 1)
 Phil Fletcher as Hacker (series 2-3)
 Mark Benton as Max de Lacey
 Sam Stockman as Simon
 Mina Anwar as Selina Sharp
 Simon Ludders as Sid the Scource (series 1)
 Miles Barrow as Newspaper Boy (series 1)
 Iain Stirling as Newspaper Deliverer (series 2)

Episodes

Season 1 (2009)

Season 2 (2010)

Season 3 (2011)

References

External links
 Scoop at the Internet Movie Database
 
 
 Episode Guide at Onthebox.com
 Article on the show's Special Effects at Smoothdevil.com

2009 British television series debuts
2000s British children's television series
2010s British children's television series
BBC high definition shows
BBC children's television shows
British television shows featuring puppetry
Children's television sitcoms
2000s British teen sitcoms
English-language television shows
2010s British teen sitcoms